La Diva is the twenty-fifth studio album by American singer Aretha Franklin, released on September 6, 1979, by Atlantic Records. The album marked the end of her 12-year tenure with Atlantic and a run of 19 original albums. The album was a commercial flop as the singer attempted to make a comeback by recording a disco-oriented project with producer Van McCoy. It was McCoy's final work as he died in June of that year; the record was released as disco was running its course.

It stands as the lowest charting and poorest selling album of Franklin's entire Atlantic Records catalogue. "Ladies Only" reached  number 33 on Billboards R&B singles chart while the follow-up, "Half A Love", stalled at number 65. This album was recorded at Franklin's vocal peak and features three of her own compositions, as well as a song by her eldest son Clarence Franklin.

Although remembered as Franklin's failed disco LP, La Diva also includes substantial funk and R&B tracks such as The Emotions' "Reasons Why", Zulema's "Half a Love" and scorching versions of Lalome Washburn's "It's Gonna Get A Bit Better" and her own "Honey I Need Your Love."

Track listing

Side one
"Ladies Only" (Aretha Franklin) – 5:15
"It's Gonna Get a Bit Better" (Lalome Washburn) – 5:20
"What If I Should Ever Need You" (Charles H. Kipps) – 3:32
"Honey I Need Your Love" (Aretha Franklin) – 2:45
"I Was Made for You" (Clarence Franklin) – 4:03

Side two
"Only Star" (Aretha Franklin) – 5:04
"Reasons Why" (Skip Scarborough, Wanda Hutchinson, Wayne Vaughan) – 3:55
"You Brought Me Back to Life" (Van McCoy) – 4:24
"Half a Love" (Zulema Cusseaux) – 5:25
"The Feeling" (Van McCoy) – 4:45

Personnel

Musicians

 Aretha Franklin – lead and backing vocals, rhythm arrangements (4)
 Van McCoy – keyboards, backing vocals, rhythm arrangements (1, 3–5, 8, 10)
 Kenneth Ascher, Richard Tee, Paul Griffin – keyboards
 Ken Bichel – synthesizer, orchestra bells
 Jack Cavari, Cornell Dupree, Tom Hanlon – guitar 
 Brian Aslop, Gordon Edwards – bass guitar
 Chris Parker – drums
 Errol "Crusher" Bennett, George Devens – percussion
 Richard Gibbs – rhythm arrangements (2)
 Arthur Jenkins – rhythm arrangements (6)
 Skip Scarborough – rhythm arrangements (7)
 Gene Orloff – conductor
 Albert Bailey – backing vocals
 Sharon Brown – backing vocals
 Zulema Cusseaux – backing vocals, rhythm arrangements (9)
 Diane Destry – backing vocals
 Carolyn Franklin – backing vocals
 Richard Harris – background vocals
 Brenda Hilliard – backing vocals
 Jerome Jackson – backing vocals
 Pete Marshall – backing vocals
 Pat Williamson – backing vocals

Production
Producers – Charles Kipps and Van McCoy (Tracks 1–3, 5, 6, 8–10); Aretha Franklin (Track 4); Skip Scarborough (Track 7)
Engineers – Lee Decarlo and Alan Varner
Assistant engineers – Rick Delana, Brian Marine and John Terrell
Mastered by George Piros at Atlantic Studios (New York, NY)

References

Aretha Franklin albums
1979 albums
Atlantic Records albums
Disco albums by American artists